Garland Routher Kiser (born July 8, 1968) is an American former Major League Baseball player.

Kiser played baseball at Sullivan Central High School in Blountville, Tennessee. As a senior, he had a 1.78 earned run average and attracted the attention of professional scouts. He was selected by the Philadelphia Phillies in the 24th round of the 1986 Major League Baseball draft and assigned to the Bend Phillies to begin his professional career. He was released by the Phillies during spring training in 1988 but was quickly picked up by the Cleveland Indians. He made his Major League debut with the Indians on September 9, 1991 against the Boston Red Sox in front of 1,695 fans a Cleveland Stadium, the smallest crowd there for a game since 1974. He struck out the final batter he faced in the Major Leagues, Don Mattingly, on October 6, 1991.

Kiser pitched in the farm systems of the Indians, the Milwaukee Brewers and the Pittsburgh Pirates through the 1994 season. He was picked up by the Colorado Rockies before the 1995 season but released in April of that year. After not pitching in the 1995 season, he appeared in 1996 in independent baseball with the Salinas Peppers. It would be his final season in professional baseball.

References

External links

1968 births
Living people
Baseball players from North Carolina
Baseball players from Tennessee
Bend Phillies players
Burlington Indians players (1986–2006)
Canton-Akron Indians players
Carolina Mudcats players
Cleveland Indians players
Gulf Coast Indians players
Kinston Indians players
Major League Baseball pitchers
New Orleans Zephyrs players
Salinas Peppers players
Spartanburg Phillies players
Watertown Indians players